Václav Lancinger was a Czech water polo player. He competed in the men's tournament at the 1920 Summer Olympics.

References

External links
 

Year of birth missing
Year of death missing
Czechoslovak male water polo players
Olympic water polo players of Czechoslovakia
Water polo players at the 1920 Summer Olympics
Place of birth missing